Claunch is a surname. Notable people with the surname include:

Austin Claunch (born 1989), American college basketball coach
Charles Kenneth Claunch (1899–1978), American government official
Quinton Claunch (1921–2021), American musician, songwriter, record producer and record label owner